Rezerwat is a 2007 Polish film. It is director Łukasz Palkowski's first film.

Plot
The story is set in a poor neighborhood in Warsaw and concerns a pickpocket and a photographer. A more substantial plot summary is available in the Polish Wikipedia and needs to be translated to English to include here.

Reception
Rezerwat does not yet have a rating from Rotten Tomatoes.

In the United States, the film is only available in a region-free DVD with English subtitles.

Cast 

 Marcin Kwaśny - Marcin
 Sonia Bohosiewicz – Hanka, 
 Grzegorz Palkowski – Grześ
 Artur Dziurman –  Roman
 Tomasz Karolak – Rysiek
 Krzysztof Janczar 
 Mariusz Drężek – Marek, 
 Bożena Adamek – Grzesia
 Mikołaj Müller 
 Jan Stawarz 
 Violetta Arlak - Krysia
 Ryszard Chlebuś 
 Waldemar Czyszak 
 Danuta Borsuk

Awards
At the Polish Film Festival, the director, editor, and supporting actress (Sonia Bohosiewicz) all won in their respective categories; additionally, Palkowski won the Critics' Award.

Notes

External links 
 
 

2007 films
2007 comedy-drama films
2007 comedy films
2007 drama films
Polish comedy-drama films
Films directed by Łukasz Palkowski